Thousand Mile Tree is a pine tree located in Weber Canyon near the community of Henefer, Utah along the Overland Route of the Union Pacific Railroad. In January 1869, graders of the railroad found a similar tree standing next to the line they were constructing, which by coincidence marked the western progress of exactly one thousand miles of road from Omaha, Nebraska/Council Bluffs, Iowa, the eastern terminus of the First transcontinental railroad.

"The tree was in the middle of a gorge between Henefer in the Upper Weber Valley and Devil’s Slide, a unique geological formation of twin limestone ridges running vertically from the canyon floor. Along with the Thousand Mile Tree, Devil's Slide immediately became a sight to be seen by all passing trains. The gorge just east of Devil’s Slide was named Wilhelmina's Pass and was the subject of several views by Union Pacific’s official photographer A. J. Russell for his stereographic tour of the new line. Although the gorge was changed significantly to accommodate today’s Interstate 84, most early trains stopped to allow passengers to appreciate the landmark, and several excursion trains from Ogden were arranged to see Wilhelmina's Pass, the Thousand Mile Tree, and Devil’s Slide.”

By 1900, the original Thousand Mile Tree had died and it was removed in September of that year.

In 2016 a drawing of the "Thousand Mile Tree" by Jim Stitt was featured on the label artwork of the 42nd annual "Our Special Ale" brewed by Anchor Brewing.

References

External links 
 Union Pacific Railroad History
 The Transcontinental Railroad
 Anchor Brewing Christmas Ale
 Youtube-Video of a train passing the tree

Individual pine trees
Individual trees in Utah
Landmarks in Utah
First transcontinental railroad
History of rail transportation in the United States
History of the American West
1869 in the United States
Union Pacific Railroad
Interstate 84 (Oregon–Utah)
American frontier